Brotherton Farm, also known as the Brotherton-McKenzie Farm, is a historic home and farm complex located at Guilford Township in Franklin County, Pennsylvania. The house was built about 1820, and is a two-story, five bay, "L"-shaped limestone dwelling in the Federal style.  It has a two-story, four-bay rear ell.  Also on the property are the contributing -story stone spring house, frame wash house, and frame bank barn.

It was listed on the National Register of Historic Places in 1979.

References 

Farms on the National Register of Historic Places in Pennsylvania
Houses on the National Register of Historic Places in Pennsylvania
Federal architecture in Pennsylvania
Houses completed in 1820
Houses in Franklin County, Pennsylvania
National Register of Historic Places in Franklin County, Pennsylvania